Niederthalheim is a municipality in the Austrian state of Upper Austria.

Population

References

External links
oberoesterreich.at/niederthalheim

Cities and towns in Vöcklabruck District